Old Heidelberg (German: Alt Heidelberg) may refer to:

 the historic German city of Heidelberg
 Old Heidelberg (poem), a poem by Joseph Victor von Scheffel 
 Alt Heidelberg (play), a 1901 play by Wilhelm Meyer-Förster
 Old Heidelberg (1915 film), a 1915 American film
 Old Heidelberg (1923 film), a 1923 German film
 The Student Prince in Old Heidelberg, a 1926 American film
 Alt Heidelberg (tale) a 1940 Japanese tale by Osamu Dazai
 Old Heidelberg (1959 film), a West German film

See also
 The Student Prince, an operetta based on the play
 The Student Prince (film), a film version of the operetta